Prozorro.Sale (Ukrainian: Прозорро.Продажі) is a state-owned enterprise managed by the Ministry of Economy. The enterprise is an online electronic auction system of the same name for the sale and lease of property. The SOE "Prozorro.Sale" administers this IT system, which guarantees the bid security, technical reliability and non-interference in auctions.

As of December 2021, electronic auctions in the Prozorro.Sale system brought organizers more than 57 billion UAH[1] (i.e. US$2.12 billion) into budgets of different levels. The company quarterly transfers 80% of its net profit to the state budget in the form of dividends and taxes.

Public sales feform

Management 

The director of State Enterprise "Prozorro.Sale" is Oleksiі Sobolev. The first deputy director since 2019 is Daria Marchak. Control over the state enterprise is carried out by an independent supervisory board. It consists of representatives of the Ministry of Economy of Ukraine, as well as three independent experts elected in an open competition.

History 
The project was launched in 2016 with the support of international donors, in particular, Western NIS Enterprise Fund (WNISEF), through the commitment and capacity of the NGO Transparency International Ukraine.

Work on the creation of the "Prozorro.Sale" system started in July 2016 with the sale of assets of liquidated banks. At that time, the reform of public procurement in Ukraine proved its effectiveness, so to develop a new project that would help to sell state and municipal property transparently, the experience of Prozorro was applied.

The initiator of the system was the Deposit Guarantee Fund of Ukraine (DGF). In 2016, when the reform of the banking system got under way, the Deposit Guarantee Fund was managing the assets of more than 90 liquidated banks. Their book value was more than UAH 400 billion (i.e. 14,86 billion USD) These assets had to be sold as soon as possible at the highest value to pay off the millions of depositors of bankrupt banks. The law established a 5-year term for doing this, but the sales model existing at that time did not allow for efficient and transparent management of the liquidated assets of banks.

Therefore, the electronic trading system (ETS) based on the principles of Prozorro was established. A team of specialists from different divisions of the Fund and the project office hosted by Transparency International Ukraine, the reform's core partner, received a political mandate to carry out the institutional transformation. The National Bank of Ukraine and the Ministry of Economy of Ukraine supported the idea. On June 24, 2016, the stakeholders concluded a Memorandum of Cooperation in building a transparent and efficient system for the sale of assets of insolvent and liquidated banks in Ukraine.

The first public auction was held in October 2016, and since February 1, 2017, all assets of bankrupt banks began being sold exclusively through online auctions in the "Prozorro.Sale" system

In 2018, with the help of the Kyiv School of Economics, a hybrid Dutch auction was designed and launched. It allows to ensure  that assets whose real value is difficult to determine will be sold at a fair market price.

In February 2019, the ETS was transferred to state ownership — the Ministry of Economic Development and Trade of Ukraine. In early January 2019, the composition of the supervisory board of the state enterprise "Prozorro.Sale" was approved.

Platforms 
Prozorro.Sale electronic trading platforms are accredited independent legal entities connected to the system. They cooperate with organizers of tenders — public or private customers — and potential buyers. Platforms advise both organizers and potential buyers, help them to register in the system, draw up a lot correctly and take part in the auction. They advertise lots and attract buyers. They maintain the software and keep the bidders' security deposit intact until the bidding results are in.

As of December 2021, there were 47 platforms accredited in the system.

Areas of work 
Through the system of electronic auctions, citizens and businesses gain access to the acquisition of unique assets owned by the state.

In 2016, the first auctions began selling the assets of bankrupt banks managed by the Deposit Guarantee Fund. Since 2017, the system has been selling the assets of state-owned and municipal enterprises. In 2018, another stream was added — small-scale privatization. The opportunity to conduct commercial auctions has been provided to the organizers in 2019. In the same year, property in bankruptcy proceedings started being sold at e-auctions. In March 2019, the State Service for Geology and Mineral Resources of Ukraine began auctioning special permits for the utilization of subsurface resources of Ukraine.

Starting February 1, 2020, all state and municipal property is leased through electronic auctions. The sale of untreated forestry timber through the system also started in 2020.

In October 2021, Prozorro.Sale began trading for the lease of state and municipal agricultural land, as well as the sale and lease of non-agricultural land by Law of Ukraine No. 1444 and Decree No. 1013.

Each area is regulated by relevant normative legal acts. The full list is available on the prozorro.sale website

Auctions 
The online "Prozorro.Sale" auctions are conducted according to two models: English — the so-called classic - and Dutch.

When submitting an offer, the company's documents are hidden and are not displayed either on the platform or on "Prozorro.Sale". Information about the number of bidders becomes available at the beginning of the auction, but information about the bidders is revealed only after the auction is over.

The English auction with increasing starting price takes place in three rounds, taking into account the minimum step of increase. Rounds of the auction are staggered, each participant can make a step-up or skip it

A Dutch auction is an electronic auction with the method of step-by-step reduction of the starting price and further submission of price bids. The general principles are the same as the English auction, but the approach is different. In 2017, it became clear that the classic English step-up auction is not ideal for all asset types.

The Dutch auction is used if previous English auctions were unsuccessful and also, when it is difficult to determine the market starting price.

In 2017, together with FGVFL and the Kyiv School of Economics (KSE), a hybrid Dutch auction to sell non-performing loans of bankrupt banks was designed and launched.

A third stage was added to the hybrid Dutch auction — the submission of price bids. The right to make a price bid at this stage is sole with the bidder who stopped the price reduction. The auction is now used in small-scale privatization, bankruptcy, leasing, and other areas. According to a KSE study, the hybrid Dutch auction leads to more sales revenue and more competition.

Awards
2017
 Citi Tech for Integrity Challenge (T4I).
2018

 C5 «Shield in the cloud award».

2019

 Global Public Service Team of the Year Award from Apolitical in the nomination Doing More for Less.
2021

 In 2021 Prozorro.Sale was nominated for the global OGP Impact Awards.

See also 
 Open Contracting Data Standard

References 

Ukrainian websites